Callows are a type of wetland found in Ireland. They are a seasonally flooded grassland ecosystem found on low-lying river floodplains.

Examples
Shannon Callows
River Suck Callows
Little Brosna Callows
Lough Eidin
Callan, County Kilkenny
Castletroy

Literary references
Patrick Deeley's novel The Lost Orchard deals with the protection of "The Callows", a marshy area.

References

Wetlands